Abengibre is a municipality in the Province of Albacete, Castile-La Mancha, Spain. It has a population of 972.

See also
Manchuela

References

External links
Abengibre

Municipalities of the Province of Albacete